Mr. Winkle Goes to War is a 1944 war comedy film starring Edward G. Robinson and Ruth Warrick, based on a novel by Theodore Pratt.

Plot
On June 1, 1942, after fourteen years working in a bank, mild-mannered 44-year-old Wilbert G. Winkle suddenly quits his boring bank job to follow his dream, to open a repair shop. Everyone is shocked, particularly his status-conscious wife Amy, who demands he choose between her and his new career. The only exception is Barry, a young orphan Mr. Winkle has befriended.

However, before the situation with Amy can be resolved, Winkle is drafted into the army. His fellow soldiers inevitably nickname him "Rip".

He becomes friends with another older recruit, Joe Tinker, who is looking to avenge his younger brother. Winkle is reassigned to help the supply sergeant keep the books, as he did in civilian life, but he rebels and, with persistence and quiet determination, becomes a mechanic, something that gives him great satisfaction. To the surprise of his sergeant, he makes it through basic training. A new regulation allows men over 38 to get an honorable discharge, but Winkle refuses to quit.

When Winkle's furlough at the end of training is cancelled, Barry runs away to try to see him. Amy and the head of the orphanage, Mr. McDavid, find him hitchhiking and bring him back. On the way, Amy learns from Barry that there is more to her husband than she thought, causing her to reconsider.

Winkle and his unit are shipped out to fight the Japanese Army in the Pacific. When he and Tinker are sent to repair a bulldozer, the Japanese attack his unit. While Winkle fixes the bulldozer, Tinker looks for revenge. After shooting an enemy soldier, Tinker starts celebrating, only to be killed himself. Winkle then uses the bulldozer to knock out a machine-gun nest.

He is discharged and sent home to recuperate from his wounds. The war hero returns to an enthusiastic welcome from his entire hometown and in particular from Amy and Barry, who show him a new shortcut they have made together to his repair shop.

Cast
 Edward G. Robinson as Wilbert G. Winkle
 Ruth Warrick as Amy Winkle
 Ted Donaldson as Barry
 Robert Armstrong as Joe Tinker
 Richard Lane as Sergeant "Alphabet" Czeidrowski
 Bob Haymes as Jack Pettigrew, another, younger bank employee also drafted
 Richard Gaines as Ralph Westcott
 Art Smith as Mr. McDavid

Robert Mitchum and Hugh Beaumont have uncredited roles.

References

External links
 
 
 
 
 Review of Mr. Winkle Goes to War at Family Friendly Movies

1944 films
1940s war comedy films
American war comedy films
American black-and-white films
Columbia Pictures films
Films based on American novels
Films directed by Alfred E. Green
Films scored by Carmen Dragon
Military humor in film
World War II films made in wartime
Pacific War films
Films with screenplays by Waldo Salt
1944 comedy films
Films scored by Paul Sawtell
1940s English-language films